Force of the Right (FD), sometimes translated as Right's Force or Right Force, is a liberal-conservative political party in Romania founded in December 2021 by Ludovic Orban, former National Liberal Party (PNL) president and former Prime Minister of Romania between 2019 and 2020, in opposition to the current leadership of the PNL which is currently officially led by Nicolae Ciucă and unofficially by Klaus Iohannis.

History 

On 3 October 2021, former Romanian PM Ludovic Orban, who had been previously defeated for the leadership of the National Liberal Party (PNL) by Florin Cîțu at the PNL congress held in September 2021 at Romexpo in Bucharest, stated that he is willing "to create a new political construction which would be ready to continue PNL's legacy". In this regard, Orban was walking in the steps of another former PNL Prime Minister, more specifically Călin Popescu-Tăriceanu, who left the PNL earlier in 2015 (also in opposition to Iohannis) in order to establish the Alliance of Liberals and Democrats (ALDE).

Furthermore, commentators claimed Orban's faction was going to party ways with the PNL should he not be designated PM after Florin Cîțu's dismissal by the Parliament, which also happened in the meantime along with the nominations of former PM Dacian Cioloș of Save Romania Union (USR) and Nicolae Ciucă of PNL proper (the latter serving as acting PM between Orban's and Cîțu's premierships/terms).

By 2 November 2021, Orban together with 14 other parliamentarians left the PNL parliamentary group. In response, the current leadership of the PNL announced its intention to exclude from the party everyone taking this move, emphasizing that "the door of PNL is closed to those who make fun of PNL". On 12 November 2021, the current leadership of the PNL expelled Orban at the proposal of Dan Vîlceanu, a supporter of Florin Cîțu. By 23 November 2021, the pro-Orban parliamentarians who left the PNL parliamentary group left the party itself as well, being followed in this move by the entirety of the National Liberal Youth (the PNL's youth wing)'s Sector 3 branch on 27 November 2021. Orban said that he rejects all neo-Marxist-progressive currents, and that the new party will be liberal conservative.

Originally, the party was going to be named the Liberal Force (FL). On 14 December 2021, Orban submitted the documents necessary in order to establish the new party, which was then going to be named after the name of his motion used to run for a second term as PNL president at the September 2021 PNL congress, more specifically the Right's Force/Force of the Right, that will be "valid until the [first] congress of the party". Orban said the Force of the Right is a pro-European party, which is not anti-establishment, and which wants to join the European People's Party (EPP). In February 2022, the parliamentary group of right-wing deputies was established to represent FD in the Chamber of Deputies, with Violeta Alexandru as its leader.

Leadership

Electoral history

Legislative elections 

 Notes
1

Notes

References 

 
Conservative parties in Romania
Liberal parties in Romania
Romanian nationalist parties
Political parties established in 2021
2021 establishments in Romania
Christian democratic parties in Europe
National liberal parties
Liberal conservative parties
Conservative liberal parties
Pro-European political parties in Romania
Nationalist parties in Romania
Right-wing populist parties